Remote Control Star is a hidden camera game show on CBBC presented by JK and Joel. Three children are chosen to join JK and Joel in their surveillance van and meet the celebrity. They control whatever the celebrity does outside or inside their fake celebrity house using a hidden ear piece. The celebrity must obey the instructions and not get caught by whoever is with them. If the celebrity makes it through each of the three tasks without getting caught they win some extra-special goodies for the three children who controlled them. The prizes are hats and tee shirts that have the Remote Control Star logo on it.

Celebrities
 Episode 1: Joe Swash
 Episode 2: Kay Purcell
 Episode 3: Warwick Davis
 Episode 4: Olly Murs
 Episode 5: Saira Khan
 Episode 6: Craig Revel Horwood
 Episode 7: Angellica Bell
 Episode 8: Rav Wilding
 Episode 9: Hayley Tamaddon
 Episode 10: Jedward

References

External links
 Official website
 Programme information
 Remote Control Star on the Internet Movie Database

BBC Television shows